The Trans-European Rail network is made up of the Trans-European high-speed rail network as well as the Trans-European conventional rail network.  The rail network is one of a number of the European Union's Trans-European transport networks (TEN-T).

According to Article 10 of the Decision No 1692/96/EC of the European Parliament and of the Council of 23 July 1996 on Community guidelines for the development of the trans-European transport network, the rail network should include the infrastructures and the facilities which enable rail and road and, where appropriate, maritime services and air transport services to be integrated. In this regard, particular attention should be paid to the connection of regional airports to the network.

One or more of the following functions should be met by any component of the rail network: 

 it should play an important role in long-distance passenger traffic 
 it should permit interconnection with airports, where appropriate 
 it should permit access to regional and local rail networks 
 it should facilitate freight transport by means of the identification and development of trunk routes dedicated to freight or routes on which freight trains have a priority 
 it should play an important role in combined transport 
 it should permit interconnection via ports of common interest with short sea shipping and inland waterways 

Standards for the rail network are set by the European Railway Agency, in the form of ERA Technical Specifications for Interoperability.

See also
Trans-European Transport Networks
Trans-European Road network
Trans-European high-speed rail network
Trans-European conventional rail network
Trans-European Inland Waterway network
Motorways of the Sea
Trans-European Seaport network
Trans-European Airport network

References

Trans-European Rail network